Ahmed Hanafy M. Rashed (born 20 November 1928, date of death unknown) was an Egyptian footballer. He competed in the men's tournament at the 1952 Summer Olympics.

References

External links
 
 

1928 births
Year of death missing
Egyptian footballers
Egypt international footballers
Olympic footballers of Egypt
Footballers at the 1952 Summer Olympics
Place of birth missing (living people)
Association football midfielders
Al Ittihad Alexandria Club players
20th-century Egyptian people